Isoperlinae is a subfamily in the family Perlodidae, also known as the perlodid stoneflies, stripetails or springflies.

Genera 
 Calliperla
 Cascadoperla
 Clioperla
 Cosumnoperla
 Isoperla
 Kaszabia
 Mesoperlina

References

External links

Perlodidae
Insect subfamilies